A halal snack pack (HSP) is a fast food dish, popular in Australia, which consists of halal-certified doner kebab meat (lamb, chicken, or beef) and chips. It also includes different kinds of sauces, usually chilli, garlic, and barbecue, whilst yoghurt or yoghurt sauce, cheese, jalapeño peppers and tabbouleh are common additions. The snack pack is traditionally served in a styrofoam container, and has been described as a staple takeaway dish of kebab shops in Australia.

Some Australian restaurant menus refer to the dish as a "snack pack", "snack box" or "mixed plate". The name of the dish was chosen by the Macquarie Dictionary as the "People's Choice Word of the Year" for 2016. In Western Australia, the dish is often called a "meat box."

History
The halal snack pack originated in Australia as a culinary fusion of Middle-Eastern and European cuisines. According to some, snack packs date back at least to the 1980s. They have since become a quintessential Australian dish. However, variations or similar dishes exist in other countries; examples include "doner meat and chips" in the United Kingdom, "döner teller" ("doner plate") in Germany, "kapsalon" ("barbershop") in the Netherlands and Belgium, "kebabtallrik" ("kebab plate") in Sweden, "gyro fries" in the United States,  and "kebab ranskalaisilla" ('kebab with French fries') in Finland. In Adelaide, South Australia, the dish is known as an "AB". Meanwhile in Perth, Western Australia the term "meat box" is commonly used.

In late 2015, following the creation of the Facebook group, Halal Snack Pack Appreciation Society, a subculture formed around the dish, it has been known to bring cultures together. This led to wide coverage of the dish in the media, as well as a notable reference by Senator Sam Dastyari in Australian Parliament during a debate about halal certification which is credited for much of the increase in attention paid to this dish.

Health concerns have been raised about the refined carbohydrate content of halal snack packs. Excess refined carbohydrates can cause obesity and heart disease, as well as cerebrovascular, metabolic and renal conditions and complications.

Halal Snack Pack Appreciation Society

The Halal Snack Pack Appreciation Society is a Facebook group established in December 2015 that is dedicated to the halal snack pack. After its establishment, the group had 16,000 members sign on in its first month, and had almost 90,000 members in April 2016. The site encourages users to post reviews of halal snack packs they consume at various restaurants and kebab shops throughout Australia. The reviews sometimes include images of the dish, and are typically based upon the criteria of meat, chips and sauce quality, halal signage, packaging, price and the greeting diners receive, all of which are based upon a scale of 1–10. As of March 2016, the site refers to the "standard" price of a halal snack pack as AUD $10.

One of the goals of the group is to identify the potential for the world's best halal snack pack. The Halal Snack Pack Appreciation  Society also raises funds to support the Australian Relief Organisation, an organisation that assists underprivileged people to attain cataract surgery and assists orphanages with matters regarding water supplies.

The group has Muslim and non-Muslim members, who refer to one another as "brothers and sisters". Users on the site have been derided by other users at times for putting tomato sauce or salad on the dish, which the site discourages, referring to such users as "haram dingos". The site also states that such users who add tomato sauce or salad may be banned from the group.

The former Australian Labor Party Senator Sam Dastyari is a member of the Halal Snack Pack Appreciation Society, and has publicly stated support for halal products and certification.

Some kebab shops and restaurants have realised significantly increased sales after being reviewed on the group's Facebook page. For example, Metro One in the inner west area of Sydney had revenue increases of over 75% after being featured on the site as making one of the best halal snack packs in the city.

In popular culture
In July 2016, then Labor Senator Sam Dastyari invited the One Nation party leader Pauline Hanson out for a halal snack pack after she won a Senate seat in the 2016 Australian federal election. She rejected his proposal, saying, “It’s not happening, not interested in halal, thank you”. Hanson then elaborated, stating, “I’m not interested in it. I don’t believe in halal certification,” and went on to claim that “98 percent of Australians” opposed it. In response, several Australian restaurants created a Pauline Hanson-inspired halal snack pack.  There has also been a GoFundMe campaign to turn Hanson's former fish and chip shop into a pop-up halal snack pack stand.

Similar dishes
The "AB" dish in Adelaide is gyros meat topped with chips, tomato sauce, chilli sauce, barbecue sauce, and garlic sauce. The dish is sometimes served with alcoholic beverages. Two restaurants in Adelaide claim they invented the dish: the North Adelaide Burger Bar (also known as the Red & White) between 1969 and 1972, and the Blue & White in 1989. The "AB" may be placed at the centre of the table and shared.

See also

 Carne asada fries – a fast-food dish typically consisting of french fries, carne asada, guacamole, sour cream and cheese
 Kapsalon – a Dutch dish consisting of fries topped with döner or shawarma meat, melted Gouda cheese, and dressed salad greens
 Munchy box – an inexpensive dish sold by fast-food and takeaway restaurants, primarily in the West of Scotland region and Glasgow
 Poutine – a Canadian dish originating in Quebec, prepared with french fries and cheese curds topped with a light brown gravy
 Spice bag – a fast food dish popular in Ireland inspired by Asian cuisine
 Yaroa - a similar street food in Dominica
 List of accompaniments to french fries

References

Further reading

External links

 

Australian fusion cuisine
Australian cuisine
Fast food
Halal food
Kebabs
Potato dishes
Turkish fusion cuisine